The Coiner–Quesenbery House, also known as Casper Coiner House, is a historic home located at Waynesboro, Virginia.  It was built in 1806, and is a two-story, three bay, Federal style house.  The house originally had a hall and parlor plan, later modified in the 1820s–1830s to a more conventional side hall plan.

It was listed on the National Register of Historic Places in 1976.

References

Houses on the National Register of Historic Places in Virginia
Federal architecture in Virginia
Houses completed in 1806
Houses in Waynesboro, Virginia
National Register of Historic Places in Waynesboro, Virginia